Dilmurat Batur (born 6 July 1989) is a Chinese footballer who currently plays for China League Two side Suzhou Dongwu.

Club career
Dilmurat played for China League Two club Xinjiang Sport Lottery between 2006 and 2009. He joined Chinese Super League side Shenzhen Ruby along with his teammate Abduwali Ablet and Yehya Ablikim on 18 March 2011. He made his senior debut on 10 April 2011 in a 1-0 home defeat against Shaanxi Renhe, coming on as a substitute for Seiichiro Maki in the 60th minute. Dilmurat played as a regular substitute player in the 2011 season, gaining 17 league appearances, however, Shenzhen Ruby relegated to the second tier by finishing the last place of the league.

In January 2014, he moved to Oman and signed a six-month contract with Al-Oruba on a free transfer.

On 4 February 2015, Dilmurat transferred to China League One side Qingdao Jonoon.

Career statistics

References

1989 births
Living people
People from Kashgar
Chinese footballers
Uyghur sportspeople
Chinese people of Uyghur descent
Footballers from Xinjiang
Association football midfielders
Chinese expatriate footballers
Shenzhen F.C. players
Al-Orouba SC players
Qingdao Hainiu F.C. (1990) players
Expatriate footballers in Oman
Chinese expatriate sportspeople in Oman
Chinese Super League players
China League One players